Mohammed Maqbool Mansoor is an Indian playback singer and lyricist who works in the Malayalam films. He is known for his works in Ennu Ninte Moideen, Charlie and Trance.

Early life 
Mansoor was born in Vallakkadavu, Thiruvananthapuram. Pursued Film Making and Sound Engineering Degree from SAE chennai.

Career 
Started his career as a background singer in Malarvadi Arts Club which was a super hit in 2010. His debut song was for Salalah Mobiles in 2014. Has also sung for Salala Mobiles 2nd official Teaser. In 2015, he wrote and sung the song Ennile Ellinaal (Mukkathe Penne) with Gopi Sundar for the film Ennu Ninte Moideen which was a big hit. He was also nominated for Best Lyricist in Malayalam at 1st IIFA Utsavam for the same work. He is also a member of Gopi Sundar's band 'Big G'.

Discography

References

External links 

Malayalam playback singers
Living people
Malayalam-language lyricists
People from Thiruvananthapuram district
Year of birth missing (living people)